Maa Tara Superfast Express is a Express train of the Indian Railways connecting Sealdah in West Bengal and Rampurhat Junction of West Bengal. It is currently being operated with 13187/13188 train numbers on a daily basis.

Service

The 13187/Maa Tara Express has an average speed of 46 km/hr and covers 226.54 km in 4h 55m . The 13188/Maa Tara Express has an average speed of 48 km/hr and covers 226.54 km in 4h 40m.

Route and halts 

The important halts of the train are:

 
 
 
 
 
 
 Prantik railway station

Coach composite

The train has standard ICF rakes with max speed of 110 kmph. The train consists of 14 coaches :

 1 AC III Chair Car
 5 Chair Car
 6 General
 2 Second-class Luggage/parcel van

Traction

Both trains are hauled by an Sealdah Shed based WAP7 electric locomotive from Sealdah to Rampurhat and vice versa.

See also 

 Sealdah railway station
 Rampurhat railway station
 Sealdah - Rampurhat Intercity Express

Notes

External links 

 13187/Maa Tara Express
 13188/Maa Tara Express

References 

Transport in Kolkata
Transport in Rampurhat
Named passenger trains of India
Rail transport in West Bengal
Railway services introduced in 2009
Express trains in India